Ramon Bosc (1300s in Reus – 1416) was a Catalan priest and writer in Latin.

He is known for the inventory of his goods and manuscripts,  which are found at the Priory of Reus, according to Juan Corminas.

Works
 Martiniana super cronicis disgestis romanorum.

References

Writers from Catalonia
Spanish Roman Catholic priests
14th-century Latin writers
15th-century Latin writers
1300 births
1416 deaths